Cyvette M. Gibson is the tenth Mayor of Paynesville, Liberia. Gibson has been a community advocate for years, working over the past 17 years in women's empowerment, legal, and city administration in Liberia and the United States. She was appointed as acting Mayor on November 14, 2012; the youngest mayor in the country. Gibson has focused her administration on improving and empowering communities in Paynesville by providing infrastructure, education, access to employment and entrepreneurship, and basic services such as water, energy, sanitation, housing, health, and safety.

Early life and education
C. Cyvette M. Gibson was born in Dakar, Senegal on December 2, 1974. She is the first daughter of Liberian natives Yvette Chesson-Wureh and Chauncy M. Gibson. Her grandfather was Attorney General Joseph J.F. Chesson, who was executed by firing squad during the 1980 Liberian coup d'état. While living on the Old Road, Sinkor Monrovia, Liberia, she acquired early education at the Bright Functional on Benson Street in Monrovia, the School of Prime Systems, the Coca-Cola Factory in Paynesville, and the Joseph Jerkins Roberts Memorial Institute in Monrovia. Due to events surrounding the coup d'état of 1980, she and her mother fled into exile.

Mayor Gibson attended the College of North West London, majoring in Social Science in 1995. She also acquired certificates in Public Speaking, Critical Reading and Writing, International studies, and Literacy and Information technology between 1994 and 1995, and Paralegal training at West Law Paralegal in 2005.

Political career 
Cyvette Gibson served as chief of office at the Monrovia City Corporation under the administration of then Mayor Mary Broh. During this time, it was reported that Gibson insulted journalists reporting on claims of human rights abuses by the mayor.

Gibson was appointed as acting Mayor of the city of Paynesville, Liberia on November 14, 2012. She was the youngest mayor in the country when appointed by President Ellen Johnson Sirleaf to the position.

Waste issues have dominated much of her tenure as Mayor of the city. While she has pushed many different trash initiatives, some of these have been criticized by citizen groups for not addressing the problem. Much of the focus has been on the commercial center of the Monrovia region, known as Red Light Market. In April 2014, she called for greater attention to waste issues from the Liberia Marketing Association.
With limited funding, she was able to enlist the support of many residents of the city (including drug addicts and the homeless) to clean up Red Light. While she focused significant attention on health during the West African Ebola virus epidemic, she turned again to waste issues afterward with a significant grant from the World Bank.

Gibson organized efforts throughout the city to deal with the Ebola outbreak in the country. She used community leaders throughout the city to educate and identify potential Ebola victims. These efforts were assisted by UNICEF. At the height of the outbreak, she was one of seven officials who were excluded from a blanket dismissal of officials by President Johnson-Sirleaf.

Since the outbreak, she has continued the focus on waste, sanitation, and education in the city. In addition, major efforts have been undertaken on development of the Dupont Road area of the city. A 2016 editorial in FrontPage Africa singled her efforts out as "transforming a once failed city."

Paynesville's partnerships 

The City of Paynesville in its efforts towards a clean and developed city, has joined the 100 Resilient Cities network.

Paynesville under the leadership of Mayor Gibson also established sister city relationship with the City of Paynesville, Minnesota (USA) and the City of Bagcilar, Istanbul (Turkey).

Achievements

 Operation Stop Ebola was a community base awareness campaign in collaboration with UNICEF to fight the deadly Ebola Virus Disease (EVD).  The campaign utilized over four hundred (400) community leaders to collect EVD data, promote sensitization awareness about the EVD and how to stop it. The campaigns also provided hygiene materials and implemented permanent hand-washing stations in communities. 
The PCC held its  first annual Science Fair November 24, 2016, challenging students to expand their interest in innovative discoveries in the sciences.

Awards
 Mayor Gibson received 2014 Awards from the Paynesville Youth for Education and Development for Financial and Moral support given to the Young people of Paynesville.
 She became the President of the Association of Mayors and Local Government Authorities of Liberia in 2017.

References

1974 births
People from Montserrado County
Women mayors of places in Liberia
Liberian people
Americo-Liberian people
People of Americo-Liberian descent
Living people
21st-century Liberian politicians
21st-century American women politicians
21st-century American politicians